Fernand Gandaho (born 21 June 1968) is a Beninese former cyclist. He competed in the individual road race at the 1992 Summer Olympics.

References

1968 births
Living people
Beninese male cyclists
Olympic cyclists of Benin
Cyclists at the 1992 Summer Olympics
Place of birth missing (living people)